Advena charon is a species of air-breathing land snail or semi-slug, a terrestrial pulmonate gastropod mollusc in the family Helicarionidae. This species is endemic to Norfolk Island, an Australian territory.

References

Gastropods of Norfolk Island
Advena (gastropod)
Endangered fauna of Australia
Gastropods described in 1913
Taxonomy articles created by Polbot